After the News is a live topical discussion programme on ITV in the United Kingdom. The show, which was broadcast every weeknight after ITV News at Ten, was hosted separately five nights a week by broadcasters Emma Barnett and Nick Ferrari, and featured a range of high-profile guests from news, politics, and popular culture.

The host is joined for the duration of the 35-minute programme by two guests with passionately-held and differing views for a lively and combative discussion on a range of stories and issues. Depending on the news agenda, the panel may be joined by an additional interviewee or contributor who is at the heart of a major news story, and the programme will make room for single interviews on particularly high-profile topics.

Emma Barnett, who hosts her own show on BBC Radio 5 Live, presented every Tuesday and Friday night, while LBC radio host Nick fronted the show on Wednesdays and Thursdays. The pair alternated on Mondays.

The programme was not shown in most of Scotland, due to the Scottish ITV licensee, STV, broadcasting their own late-night current affairs programme, Scotland Tonight in the same slot.

References

2017 British television series debuts
2017 British television series endings
British television news shows
English-language television shows
ITN
ITV news shows